The flag of Buenos Aires was originally designed in 1580, but it was officially adopted on October 24, 1995. It shows the coat of arms of the House of Habsburg, as the flag has an eagle on a white background. The use of Habsburg symbols comes from Charles V of the Habsburg dynasty, who was king of Spain when Buenos Aires was originally founded in 1536. The city was eventually abandoned, but it was refounded in 1580, during the reign of Charles V's son, Philip II.

History
On September 28, 1995, the City council of Buenos Aires passed ordenance 49.669, which established the city flag. The ordenance came into effect with decree 1.291 on October 24, 1995. The first article states that the official city flag features a white field with the shield designed in 1580 by Juan de Garay in its center. This flags features a crowned black eagle, with four eaglets and a colored cross in its right claw. The cross is known as the Calatrava cross, since it was used by the Military order of Calatrava in Spain.

Symbolism
The eagle represents Spanish colonization, the  represents evangelism, the crown represents monarchy and the four eaglets represent four cities that were founded in that period: Santa Fe, La Trinidad (Buenos Aires), Corrientes and Concepción del Bermejo.

Controversy 
This flag has been criticized for having symbols that some consider to be monarchist, authoritarian and linked to Spanish imperialism and colonialism. Some legislators have proposed changing the flag because these symbols do not reflect the values of Porteño denizens.

References

Flag
Flags of Argentina
Flags of cities
Flags introduced in 1995
Flags displaying animals
Flags with crosses